With Stanley in Africa is a 1922 American adventure film serial directed by William James Craft and Edward A. Kull and released by Universal Film Manufacturing Co. This serial is considered to be a lost film.

Plot

Cast
 George Walsh as Jack Cameron
 Louise Lorraine as Nadia Elkins
 Charles Mason as Reynard Lake
 William Welsh as Henry Morton Stanley
 Gordon Sackville
 Jack Mower
 Fred Kohler
 Joe King as David Livingston

Chapter titles
 Jaws of the Jungle
 The Grip of the Slavers
 Paths of Peril
 Find Livingston
 The Flaming Spear
 Lost in the Jungle
 Trail of the Serpent
 Pool of Death
 Menace of the Jungle
 The Ordeal
 The Lion's Prey
 The Forest of Flame
 Buried Alive
 The Lair of Death
 The Good Samaritan
 The Slave's Secret
 The White Tribe
 Out of the Dark

See also
 List of film serials
 List of film serials by studio
 List of lost films

References

External links

With Stanley in Africa at silentera.com

1922 films
American silent serial films
Lost American films
1922 adventure films
American black-and-white films
Universal Pictures film serials
Films directed by William James Craft
Films directed by Edward A. Kull
Films set in Africa
Cultural depictions of Henry Morton Stanley
1922 lost films
Films with screenplays by George H. Plympton
1920s American films
Silent adventure films